The Americana at Brand is a large shopping, dining, entertainment and residential complex in Glendale, California. The property was built and is owned and operated by Los Angeles businessman Rick J. Caruso and his company Caruso Affiliated.  Caruso Affiliated has built and operates many other projects, including The Grove at Farmers Market in Los Angeles. The Americana at Brand's 82 retail shops include Barneys New York, Nordstrom, XXI Forever, and David Yurman;  its restaurants include Din Tai Fung, Bourbon Steak by Michael Mina, and Katsuya; the complex comprises 100 condominiums and 242 luxury apartments.

The Americana project stirred debate in Glendale for four years.  Some merchants feared the Grove-style "lifestyle center" would diminish business at the stores along Brand Boulevard and in the Glendale Galleria. Some residents worried about overdevelopment and traffic congestion.

Both The Americana at Brand and The Grove are organized upon the idea of a city center—with a mix of architectural styles, building heights and materials used, as well as vast open spaces at each project's center. Caruso Affiliated often casts its developments in a particular milieu. The architectural style of the Americana reflects the brick factory facades of the industrial era, with its massive elevator shaft with exposed steel beams, while The Grove is reminiscent of 1930s Los Angeles, California. Each of the two intends to appear to be a public space, but is private property and is protected as such. However, the two-acre park in the center of the complex is entirely public property. The private security force that patrols the property prevents anyone from taking photographs with professional equipment without permission. The Americana at Brand allows dogs on the property — except on its grassy area. The only breed restricted is the pit bull. Each store decides whether it allows pets.

The project opened to the public on May 2, 2008.

Shops and restaurants

The Americana at Brand shares some of its retail and dining options with sister center The Grove at Farmers Market, such as a three-level flagship Barnes & Noble as well as Barneys New York, J.Crew, Apple, Kiehl's, The Cheesecake Factory, Topshop Topman, and Anthropologie, and is anchored by a three-level Nordstrom. It also features a two-level H&M, Urban Outfitters, Calvin Klein, an 18-theater AMC Theatres (formerly Pacific Theaters) cinema, American Eagle Outfitters, and higher-end stores like, Tiffany and Co., David Yurman, and Marciano. Some of the restaurants at The Americana at Brand are local concepts, such as Frida Mexican Cuisine, Chi Dynasty, and Trattoria Amici, as well as internationally recognized restaurants including Din Tai Fung, and Bourbon Steak by Michael Mina.

List of tenants
As of July 2022, there are over 80 tenants in the Americana.

Anchors
Nordstrom (opened in 2013, formerly occupied at the Glendale Galleria)
Barnes & Noble
AMC Theatres (reopened in August 2021, formerly Pacific Theatres)
Amazon Style (previously Barneys New York, closed due to bankruptcy)
XXI Forever
H&M

Specialty stores and services
Some notable tenants (not including anchors) include Anthropologie, Ray-Ban, Tiffany & Co., David Yurman, Calvin Klein, Sephora, Fantastic Sams, Apple, Tesla, Sur La Table, and Urban Outfitters. The Americana also offers various services to visitors, including ATMs from Bank of America and Chase, an electric car charging station, bike valet, a car wash, a family lounge, concierge services, and real estate offices occupied by Keller Williams Realty.

Restaurants
Food and beverage stores at the Americana range from specialty food pop-ups to high-end restaurants. These include tenants such as the Capital One Cafe (one of four in Los Angeles County), The Cheesecake Factory, Häagen-Dazs, Jamba Juice, The Coffee Bean & Tea Leaf, Wetzel's Pretzels, Ladurée, Sprinkles Cupcakes, Eggslut, Shake Shack, Din Tai Fung, and Bourbon Steak by Michael Mina.

Attractions
In addition to The Americana at Brand's upscale shops, restaurants and movie theater, the outdoor mall features Waters of Americana, an animated fountain by WET. The musical fountain, located in the central landscaped park, performs every hour on the hour, though a non-musical program runs between shows. A gold-leaf statue, chosen by developer Rick Caruso, rises from the center of the fountain's smaller pool. The statue is a replica of Donald De Lue's 1949 Spirit of American Youth sculpture in France, a memorial to Americans who fought at Normandy in World War II. The statue also serves as the icon for The Americana at Brand.

An internal transit system uses a battery-powered trolley car (built by the Gomaco Trolley Company)  to shuttle visitors through the main square and around the perimeter of the complex. The line was in operation from the opening of the Americana at Brand complex, in May 2008. George F. McGinnis, a retired Disney Imagineer, designed the trolley cars.

On Nov 6, Stranger Things day, Netflix launched the first-ever Stranger Things store in the Americana at Brand. The shop immerses fans in a world of supernatural mystery and 80’s nostalgia in a one-of-a-kind Stranger Things experience.

Holiday season 

During the holiday shopping season, fake snow is produced periodically every evening. In mid-November, a Christmas tree is displayed, and lit every evening, beginning with their annual Tree Lighting Ceremony. The tree remains lit every evening for the remainder of the holiday season. The tree is up to 100 feet or more, and it is usually one of the tallest trees in Los Angeles County.

References

External links 

 Official Website of The Americana at Brand

Shopping malls in the San Fernando Valley
Buildings and structures in Glendale, California
Tourist attractions in Glendale, California
Shopping malls established in 2008